Whale Mountain may refer to:

Whale Mountain (San Bernardino County, California)
Whale Mountain (San Diego County, California)

See also
 Blue Whale Mountain